The American Trucking Associations (ATA), founded in 1933, is the largest national trade association for the trucking industry. ATA represents more than 37,000 members covering every type of motor carrier in the United States through a federation of other trucking groups, industry-related conferences, and its 50 affiliated state trucking associations. Former Governor of Kansas Bill Graves was replaced by Chris Spear as the ATA's president and CEO in July 2016.

According to its website the ATA's mission is to "develop, advocate, and advance innovative research-based policies that promote highway safety, security, environmental sustainability and profitability."

History 

On September 23, 1933, the American Trucking Associations was established as a national affiliation of state trucking organizations. The ATA was established by a merger of the American Highway Freight Association and the Federated Trucking Associations of America.

The ATA began with a staff of eight working from a three-room suite in the Transportation Building in Washington, D.C. During World War II the Army requested that ATA recruit personnel for two quartermaster regiments to constitute the U.S.Army Transportation Corps. With calls to the 350 members of the ATA's Trucking Service War Council, 5,700 trucking industry employees volunteered for enlisted positions and 258 volunteered for officer commissions. After the war the ATA was in the forefront of the groups and industries supporting Dwight D. Eisenhower's Interstate Highway System.

The American Trucking Association has worked on regulatory issues from the Code of Fair Competition in 1934 to the eventual deregulation of the industry.

The ATA's headquarters are in Arlington, Virginia. The ATA has a legislative affairs office on Capitol Hill in Washington, D.C.

In 2016, ATA named Chris Spear as the federation's ninth president, replacing former Kansas Governor Bill Graves.

Organization

ATA is the trade association representing its members before Congress, the executive branch, the courts, and the regulatory agencies. It includes 50 state trucking associations, two conferences and three councils. Each state association is an independent organization with its own membership, dues structure, officers, budgets and staff, but having representation and voting powers within the federation. Like the state associations, ATA's conferences (each representing a segment of the industry) are autonomous organizations.

ATA is composed of motor carrier members and is governed by a board of elected carrier representative members. A smaller executive committee is composed of elected members that set policies and priorities. Allied members, representing suppliers to the trucking industry, also have representation within the organization. All ATA members are provided access to experts in safety, engineering, law, finance, communications, information and logistics technology, regulatory and legislative affairs, and a number of other areas of service to the trucking industry.

As members of the federation, ATA's councils are dedicated to continuing education and policy in specific trucking disciplines including safety management, maintenance, finance and accounting, information technology, logistics, and more.

Policies
The ATA's messages revolve around three core areas: the essentiality of the trucking industry to the economy; the industry's ongoing efforts and progress made to improve highway safety; and the industry's commitment to reducing emissions and carbon output.

Essentiality
ATA advocates the essentiality of the trucking industry in the U.S. economy. Trucks haul nearly 100 percent of consumer goods and more than 70 percent of all freight tonnage in the United States. Moreover, economists estimate that 80 percent of U.S. communities receive their goods exclusively by truck.

Economists expect the U.S. population to grow by 27 million in the next 10 years, and overall freight tonnage to increase 26 percent by 2021, with the modal share hauled by truck increasing to 71 percent. To keep pace with this growth, ATA advocates increasing capacity and improving highway infrastructure at the nation's worst traffic congestion points to ensure the efficient movement of goods.

Safety

ATA's safety message focuses on three different key areas: improving driver performance, safer vehicles, and safer motor carriers. The ATA maintains that the trucking industry is safer than it has ever been, according to truck vehicle miles traveled (VMT) figures from the Federal Highway Administration (FHWA), and National Highway Traffic Safety Administration (NHTSA) data on crashes. Since new Hours-of-Service regulations took effect in 2004, the truck-involved fatality rate has come down more than 20 percent and is at its lowest since the U.S. Department of Transportation began keeping those records in 1975. The fatality rate has declined more than 66 percent since 1975. The trucking industry has also seen an increase in safety belt usage.

In 2008, ATA released a progressive 18-point safety agenda to help further improve highway safety. ATA recommends the following in order to increase safety through improving driver performance: uniform commercial drivers license (CDL) testing standards, additional parking facilities for trucks, a national maximum speed limit of 65 mph, strategies to increase use of safety belts, increased use of red light cameras, and more stringent laws to reduce drinking and driving. In order to make vehicles safer the ATA supports: targeted electronic speed governing of certain non-commercial vehicles, electronic speed governing of all large trucks, and new large truck crashworthiness standards. Finally, the ATA promotes making motor carriers safer through: a national employer notification system, a national clearinghouse for positive drug and alcohol test results of CDL holders, and required safety training by new entrant motor carriers.

Sustainability
 
ATA supports environmental sustainability policies that provide the trucking industry with realistic ways of reducing greenhouse gas emissions without impeding the freedom of movement essential to the U.S. economy. ATA has six recommendations to reduce carbon emissions in the trucking industry: enacting a national 65 mph speed limit and governing truck speeds to 65 mph or lower, decreasing idling, increasing fuel efficiency, reducing congestion through highway improvements, promoting the use of more productive truck combinations, and through supporting national fuel economy standards for medium- and heavy-duty trucks.

Also, ATA recommends that shippers and carriers join the Environmental Protection Agency's (EPA) SmartWay Transport Partnership Program. In 2009 ATA was awarded the SmartWay Excellence Award. By 2012, the SmartWay Transport Partnership will cut carbon dioxide emissions by 33 to 66 million metric tons per year.

Strategic plan
The ATA has instituted a five step plan to meet the above goals:
 Encouraging the trucking industry to prioritize safety
 Continually increasing efficiency and productivity
 Branding ATA as the authoritative voice for the industry
 Providing solid leadership in the industry
 Maximizing human and financial resources to achieve the above mission

Subsidiaries, conferences and councils

 Transport Topics is the national weekly business publication published by Transport Topics Publishing Group covering trucking and freight transportation news. It is owned by ATA and has been published since 1935. According to the Audit Bureau of Circulations, the publication had a paid circulation of approximately 30,000 in May 2007. Its readers consist mainly of executives and managers involved in trucking, logistics and freight transportation.
The American Transportation Research Institute (ATRI)- According to its website ATRI "and its predecessor organization the ATA Foundation have been engaged in critical transportation studies and operational tests since 1954. ATRI's primary mission is to conduct research in the field of transportation, with an emphasis on the trucking industry's essential role in a safe, efficient, and viable transportation system".

Conferences
ATA Conferences bring together groups of member motor carriers and suppliers in a specific line of business. Conferences are open to all ATA members and have policymaking and advocacy authority in their operational areas.

The Automobile Carriers Conference covers issues related to the transportation of automobiles and trucks for manufacturers, dealers and consumers.
The Agricultural and Food Transporters Conference is concerned with the transporters of food, timber, natural resources, farm commodities and supplies, both for-hire and private.
The Intermodal Motor Carriers Conference represents trucking operations at ports the handling of intermodal containers.

Councils

National Accounting and Finance Council– A council for carrier CFOs and managers in federal and state tax compliance, financial management, accounting, insurance, and risk management.
Information Technology & Logistics Council– A council for today's IT, logistics and operations professionals.
Safety Management Council– A council for industry practitioners in safety, workplace injury prevention, human resources and employee health.
Transportation Security Council - A council for home to carrier personnel in cargo theft, Homeland Security, background check, freight claims, and security regulatory compliance.
Technology & Maintenance Council- A council for trucking experts in equipment maintenance and specifications, purchasing and on-board truck technologies.

Driver of the Year
The ATA National Driver of the Year Award recognizes one professional truck driver for his/her exemplary accomplishments and excellent driving attributes. Contestants for the ATA award start out by winning at the company level and are nominated by state trucking associations.

At the national level, the Driver of the Year Award is presented to a driver whose professional qualifications, experience and performance are noteworthy. A driver may be nominated for an outstanding deed of heroism or highway courtesy; an outstanding contribution to highway safety, and/or a long record of safe and courteous driving - or a combination of part or all of these. An impartial panel of judges from the trucking industry, government and law enforcement chooses the winner.

The honor is considered among the highest a commercial truck driver can receive. As the ATA National Driver of the Year, the winner receives a cash prize, trophy and diamond lapel pin at the ATA Annual Awards Banquet.

Past ATA National Driver of the Year Award Winners are:

Technology & Maintenance Council
The Technology & Maintenance Council (TMC) creates standards for engineering and maintenance practices.

For example, Recommended Practice RP 243 tells tire manufactures how to use yellow and red dots on tire rims to let installers know the balance points of the tire.

Litigation
In 2013, the Supreme Court of the United States held in American Trucking Ass'ns, Inc. v. City of Los Angeles that certain environmental requirements imposed by a city were preempted by federal law.

References

External links
Official website
Trucks Deliver a Cleaner Tomorrow - ATA's sustainability program

Transportation associations in the United States
1933 establishments in the United States
Trucking industry in the United States